The Malian Football Federation is the governing body of football in Mali. Founded in 1960, it joined the CAF  in 1962 and has been affiliated with FIFA since 1964. Its first general secretary was Garan Fabou Kouyate. Famous leaders are Amadou Diakite and Tidiane Niambele.

The federation was suspended by FIFA on 17 March 2017.

The federation bureau was dissolved in July 2005 due to Malian national football team's poor performance during the World Cup and the African Nations Cup qualifying of 2006.

The composition of the new bureau is as follows:

President: Boubacar Baba Diarra
Vice President: Boukary Sidibé
General Secretary: Yacouba Traoré
Treasurer: Seydou Sow
Media Officer: Salaha Baby
Jerseys: Green
Shorts: Yellow
Socks: Red
Futsal Coordinator: Abdou Maïga

References

External links
 
 
 Mali FF at the FIFA website.
 Mali FF at CAF Online

Mali
Football in Mali
Sports organizations established in 1960
Football